During the 2020-21 Season the Men's team played in Basketettan Södra and the Women's team played in Basketligan dam.

Men's Season 
Due to the COVID-19 pandemic and restrictions only one game was played by Helsingborg in Basketettan Södra during the 2020–21 season. The Swedish Basketball Federation was therefore forced to make a decisions out of the ordinary this season as well. With HBBK's will to play in Superettan as strong as ever they chose to apply for a spot in the second tier for the following season. After proving to the federation that the organization had a strong enough base the decision was made that Helsingborg would play in Superettan once again.

Women's Season 
The first season in Basketligan dam was a season filled with tough experiences. It took the team 11 games to get their first win in SBL, also the first-ever victory in the highest tier of Swedish basketball ever. This would be their only win in their inaugural season, ending with a 1–21 record. Due to the decision made by the Swedish Basketball Federation on June 11, 2020, that no team will be relegated from SBL after the 2020–21 season. It gave HBBK the security of staying up no matter what.

Rosters

Men's

Women's

References 

2020–21 in European basketball by club